Vanai or Venai may refer to:

Vanai, Kermanshah
Venai, Khuzestan
Vanai, Lorestan
Vanai, Dahanu, India